UFC on Fox: Shogun vs. Vera (also known as UFC on Fox 4) was a mixed martial arts event held by the Ultimate Fighting Championship on August 4, 2012 at Staples Center in Los Angeles, California.

Background

Chad Griggs was expected to face Phil Davis at the event.  However, Griggs was forced out of the bout with an injury and replaced by promotional newcomer Wagner Prado.

Brian Stann was expected to headline the event against promotional newcomer Héctor Lombard. However, Stann was forced out of the bout citing a shoulder injury.

Maurício Rua instead headlined the fight against Brandon Vera, both being pulled from fights on earlier cards.

A featherweight bout between Josh Grispi and Pablo Garza was scheduled to take place at the event. However, Garza was forced to withdraw from the fight and was replaced by Rani Yahya.

A lightweight bout between Joe Lauzon and Terry Etim was scheduled to take place at the event. However, Etim was forced to withdraw from the fight and was replaced by Jamie Varner.

Rob Broughton was expected to face Matt Mitrione at the event.  However, the bout was scrapped after Broughton pulled out due to an undisclosed personal matter.

On July 25, 2012, Ben Rothwell pulled out of his fight against Travis Browne due to an injured ankle. This led to Browne being removed from the card, while Mike Swick vs DaMarques Johnson was bumped up to the main card.

Results

Bonus Awards

Fighters were awarded $50,000 bonuses.

Fight of the Night: Joe Lauzon vs. Jamie Varner
Knockout of the Night: Mike Swick
Submission of the Night: Joe Lauzon

Reported Payout

The following is the reported payout to the fighters as reported to the California State Athletic Commission. It does not include sponsor money and also does not include the UFC's traditional "fight night" bonuses.

Maurício Rua: $240,000 (includes $70,000 win bonus) def. Brandon Vera: $70,000
Lyoto Machida: $200,000 (no win bonus) def. Ryan Bader: $47,000
Joe Lauzon: $48,000 (includes $24,000 win bonus) def. Jamie Varner: $12,000
Mike Swick: $86,000 (includes $43,000 win bonus) def. DaMarques Johnson: $18,000
Nam Phan: $20,000 (includes $10,000 win bonus) def. Cole Miller: $21,000
Phil Davis: $30,000 vs. Wagner Prado: $16,000
Rani Yahya: $24,000 (includes $12,000 win bonus) def. Josh Grispi: $15,000
Phil De Fries: $32,000 (includes $16,000 win bonus) def. Oli Thompson: $11,000
Manvel Gamburyan: $36,000 (includes $18,000 win bonus) def. Michihiro Omigawa: $11,000
John Moraga: $18,000 (includes $9,000 win bonus) def. Ulysses Gomez: $8,000

See also
List of UFC events
2012 in UFC

References

External links
 Official UFC past events page
 UFC events results at Sherdog.com

Fox UFC
2012 in mixed martial arts
Mixed martial arts in Los Angeles
2012 in sports in California
Events in Los Angeles